Thomas Valentin "Valla" Aass (28 April 1887 – 14 August 1961) was a Norwegian sailor and civil servant in the foreign service.

He was born in Kristiania as a son of wholesaler Julius Aas (1832–1909) and Hulda Mathilde Olsen (1848–1929). In 1923 he married lighthouse director's daughter Ingeborg Horn.

He finished his secondary education in 1905 and graduated from the Royal Frederick University with the cand.jur. degree in 1911. From 1912 to 1915 he was a deputy to the stipendiary magistrate of Fredrikstad. He competed in the 1912 Summer Olympics as a crew member of the Norwegian boat Taifun, which won the gold medal in the 8 metre class. He represented the Royal Norwegian Yacht Club.

In 1917 he was hired in the foreign service, as a secretary in the Ministry of Foreign Affairs. He was promoted to acting assistant secretary in 1920, then acting consul in Barcelona in 1921 and acting legation secretary in London in 1922. He was promoted to vice consul in the next year. In 1930 he was moved to the Norwegian legation in Stockholm as a secretary. He also had responsibility for Kaunas, Lithuania.

After a period at home as assistant secretary in the 2nd Trade Office of the Ministry of Foreign Affairs from 1934 to 1940 he returned to the Norwegian legation in Stockholm as councillor of trade. The legation became of the utmost importance when Norway was dragged into the Second World War while Sweden remained neutral. He was promoted to legation councillor in 1943, and in 1946 consul-general in Gothenburg.

He was decorated as a Knight, First Class of the Order of St. Olav (1946), Commander of the Order of the Polar Star, Order of Vasa, Order of Isabella the Catholic; Knight of the Order of the Dannebrog and Officer of the Order of Polonia Restituta. He died in April 1961 and was buried at Ris.

References

1887 births
1961 deaths
Sportspeople from Oslo
Norwegian male sailors (sport)
Sailors at the 1912 Summer Olympics – 8 Metre
Olympic sailors of Norway
Olympic gold medalists for Norway
Olympic medalists in sailing
University of Oslo alumni
Norwegian civil servants
Norwegian expatriate sportspeople in Spain
Norwegian expatriates in England
Norwegian expatriates in Sweden
Commanders of the Order of the Polar Star
Commanders of the Order of Vasa
Recipients of the Order of Isabella the Catholic
Commanders of the Order of Isabella the Catholic
Knights of the Order of the Dannebrog
Officers of the Order of Polonia Restituta
Norwegian people of World War II
Medalists at the 1912 Summer Olympics